Abbas Beydoun (born 1945) is a Lebanese poet, novelist and journalist. He was born in the village of Sur near Tyre in southern Lebanon. His father was a teacher. Beydoun studied at the Lebanese University in Beirut and the Sorbonne in Paris. He was involved in left-wing politics and spent time in jail as a young man in 1968 and 1982.

Since becoming a full-time writer, he has published 18 volumes of poetry, among them Hujurat, Li Mareedin Huwa al-Amal, and Ashiqa'a Nadamuna. His work has been translated into all the major European languages, and English translations of his poetry have appeared in several issues of Banipal magazine. Beydoun has mentioned Pierre Jean Jouve and Yannis Ritsos among his key poetic influences.

He also published a novel called Tahlil damm in 2002. The English translation by Max Weiss, titled Blood Test, won the Arkansas Arabic Translation Award in 2008.

Since 1997, Beydoun has been cultural editor of the Beiruti newspaper As-Safir. In 2019, Beydoun was a contributor to A New Divan: A Lyrical Dialogue Between East and West .

His 2021 novel Boxes of Desire, published by Dar al-Ain, was longlisted for the International Prize for Arabic Fiction.

Awards and honors
2017 Sheikh Zayed Book Award in "Literature" for Khareef al Bara’a (The Autumn of Innocence)
2021 nomination for the Arabic Booker Prize for Boxes of Desire

References

External links
 "Writing the Language of Absence": essay by Abbas Beydoun in Banipal magazine
 An exchange of correspondence between Abbas Beydoun and Michael Kleeberg discussing the war against Iraq

20th-century Lebanese poets
Lebanese journalists
Lebanese novelists
1945 births
Living people
Lebanese male poets
20th-century male writers